KAFC is a commercial christian contemporary music radio station in Anchorage, Alaska, broadcasting on 93.7 FM.  Its studios are located on Northern Lights Boulevard at Boniface Parkway in Anchorage, and its transmitter is in the Bayshore district.

External links
 
 

2000 establishments in Alaska
Contemporary Christian radio stations in the United States
Radio stations established in 2000
AFC
AFC